Heinz-Günter Scheil (born 9 November 1962) is a retired German football player and current manager.

Career

Scheil made his debut in the Bundesliga for Eintracht Braunschweig, where he spent his entire career, on 8 September 1984, in a game against SV Waldhof Mannheim. This should remain the only Bundesliga game of his career, as Braunschweig was relegated at the end of the season. Scheil continued to play for the club in the 2. Bundesliga, making 189 appearances at this level until he retired in 1993.

Managing career

After retiring as a player, Scheil worked as assistant manager at Eintracht Braunschweig from 1995 until 1997, also taking over as caretaker manager for a time in 1995 after manager Jan Olsson had been sacked. Scheil went on to manage several local lower division sides during the next few years, until returning as assistant manager at Braunschweig for the 2007–08 season.

Personal life

Heinz-Günter Scheil has a son, Dominik Scheil, who also played professionally for Eintracht Braunschweig.

References

External links
 

1962 births
Living people
Sportspeople from Braunschweig
German footballers
Association football midfielders
Association football defenders
German football managers
Eintracht Braunschweig players
Eintracht Braunschweig II players
Eintracht Braunschweig managers
Eintracht Braunschweig non-playing staff
Bundesliga players
2. Bundesliga players
Footballers from Lower Saxony